The Living Dead is a 2020 horror novel authored by George A. Romero and Daniel Kraus. The book was unfinished upon Romero's death in 2017 and Kraus was hired to complete the novel using Romero's notes and incorporating an old short story by Romero.

Synopsis
The book is divided into three acts; "The Birth of Death", "The Life of Death", and "The Death of Death". The acts each cover a period of time from the first known zombie attack and forward to the next eleven years.

Reception
Kirkus Reviews gave the novel a positive review calling it "a spectacular horror epic." The Times called the book "everything you could have hoped for."

References

External links
George Romero is alive! With a posthumous zombie novel as urgent as his ’60s classics
Who do you get to finish George A Romero’s zombie novel? A lifelong fan

2021 American novels
American horror novels
American post-apocalyptic novels
American zombie novels
Dystopian novels
Tor Books books